Ze'ev Zrizi,  (born 1916 – August 3, 2011) was the second mayor of the Israeli city of Beersheba.

Zrizi was a member of the city council since 1949, representing Mapam. In 1961 after political changes within the city, the city council appointed him to replace founding Mayor David Tuviyahu.

In 1963, Zrizi was succeeded by Eliyahu Nawi, although he continued serving as Nawi's deputy in the ruling Mapai–Mapam coalition for nearly 20 years.

References

Bibliography
 

1916 births
2011 deaths
People from Wyszków
Deputy mayors of places in Israel
Jewish Israeli politicians
Mapam politicians
Mayors of Beersheba
Polish emigrants to Mandatory Palestine